Francis Buchanan White (20 March 1842, Perth – 3 December 1894, Perth) was a Scottish entomologist and botanist.

He studied medicine at the University of Edinburgh, graduating with an M.D. in 1864. After doing a Grand Tour in 1866, he settled in Perth where he would remain his entire life. His main area of interest was the Lepidoptera and the taxonomy of the Hemiptera. He was the author of  numerous scientific papers, published in the Scottish Naturalist, Journal of Botany, British and Foreign, and The Proceedings and Transactions of the Perthshire Society of Natural Science. White was elected in 1868 a Fellow of the Royal Entomological Society and in 1873 a Fellow of the Linnean Society.

In 1883, Buchanan White redescribed the known species of the Hemiptera genus Halobates and he illustrated 11 species in colour, with numerous drawings in black and white of structural details. This was one of the parts of the Challenger Report.

Selected publications
 (See Thomas Blackburn (entomologist).)

with J. W. H. Trail:

References

 

1842 births
1894 deaths
People from Perth, Scotland
Scottish botanists
Scottish publishers (people)
Scottish entomologists
Alumni of the University of Edinburgh
Fellows of the Royal Entomological Society
Fellows of the Linnean Society of London
19th-century Scottish businesspeople